Havlin is a surname. Notable people with the surname include:

Jakub Havlín (born 1979), Czech bobsledder
Moshe Havlin (born 1948), Israeli rabbi
Sarah Havlin
Shlomo Havlin (born 1942), Israeli physicist